The  was a class of minelayers of the Imperial Japanese Navy (IJN), serving during World War II. They were built to supplement the timeworn Sokuten-class. 4 vessels were built in 1941–42 under the Maru Rin Programme (Ship # 257–260).

Background
 In 1939, the Sokuten-class was the main minelayer of the local guard districts. However, they were too old. The IJN wanted new small minelayers for local guard districts.
 In 1940, the IJN found out a handy boat. It was a standard longline fishing ship  Sōyō Maru (160 tons) by the Ministry of Agriculture, Forestry. The IJN made a model of it and completed a design of new small minelayer. Uraga Dock Company built all of the vessels.

Ships in class

Photos

Notes

Bibliography
Ships of the World special issue Vol.45, Escort Vessels of the Imperial Japanese Navy, (Japan), February 1996
The Maru Special, Japanese Naval Vessels No.47, Japanese naval mine warfare crafts,  (Japan), January 1981

 
Minelayers of the Imperial Japanese Navy